Elliot Christian Newby (born 21 November 1995) is an English professional footballer who plays as a midfielder for Barrow.

Career
In July 2018 he moved from AFC Telford United to Chorley. The club was promoted at the end of the season.

Newby re-signed for Barrow in January 2023.

Personal life
His twin brother Alex is also footballer.

Career statistics

Honours
Chorley
National League North play-offs: 2019

Stockport County
National League: 2021–22

References

1995 births
Living people
Footballers from Barrow-in-Furness
English footballers
Association football midfielders
Barrow A.F.C. players
Altrincham F.C. players
AFC Telford United players
Chorley F.C. players
Stockport County F.C. players
FC Halifax Town players
National League (English football) players
English Football League players